Betty Botter is a tongue-twister written by Carolyn Wells.  It was originally titled "The Butter Betty Bought."  By the middle of the 20th century, it had become part of the Mother Goose collection of nursery rhymes.

Construction
The construction is based on alliteration, using the repeated two-syllable pattern /'b__tə 'b__tə 'b__tə/ with a range of vowels in the first, stressed syllable.
The difficulty is in clearly and consistently differentiating all the vowels from each other.
They are almost all short vowels:
/æ/ batter
/e/ better - Betty
/ɪ/ bitter - bit o'
/ɒ/ Botter
/ʌ/ butter
with one long vowel /ɔ:/ 'Bought a'

Lyrics 
When it was first published in "The Jingle Book" in 1899 it read:

Betty Botta bought some butter;

“But,” said she, “this butter’s bitter!

If I put it in my batter

It will make my batter bitter.

But a bit o’ better butter

Will but make my batter better.”

Then she bought a bit o’ butter

Better than the bitter butter,

Made her bitter batter better.

So ’twas better Betty Botta

Bought a bit o’ better butter.

Variations

Bronte Alberts' version 
Betty Botter bought a bit of butter
But the bit of butter Betty Botter bought was bitter
So Betty Botter bought a better bit of butter

Oscheff Fia's short version 
Betty Botter bought a bit of butter
but the bit of butter was bitter
so Betty Botter bought a bit of better butter
to make the bit of bitter butter better.

A long version 
Betty Botter bought some butter but, she said, this butter's bitter; if I put it in my batter, it will make my batter bitter. But, a bit of better butter will make my batter better. So 'twas better Betty Botter bought a bit of better butter.

Betty Batta 
Betty Batta bought some butter, but she said "this butter's bitter if I put it in my batter it will make my batter bitter". So she bought some better butter, better than the bitter butter put it in her batter and the batter tasted better.

James Josie's Version 
Betty Botter bought some butter,
But Betty Botter found her butter bitter.

So Betty Botter bought some better butter.

A little bit of bitter butter didn't bother Betty.

But her better butter better not be bitter!

There was an animated version featured on PBS Kids Television Channel, animated by Lynn Tomlinson. In this variation the rhyme is as follows:

Betty Botter bought some butter,

but the butter, it was bitter.

If she put it in her batter, it would make her batter bitter,

but a bit of better butter, that would make her batter better.

So, she bought a bit of butter, better than her bitter butter,

And she put it in her batter, and her batter was not bitter.

So, T'was better Betty Botter bought a bit of better butter.

 Betty Botter bought some butter...

Betty Botter bought some butter
but she said the butter was bitter
if I put it in my batter, it would make my batter bitter 
but a bit of better butter would make my batter better
So, Betty Botter bought some butter better than her bitter butter
and if I put it in my batter it would make my batter better.

Another version (from the UK) 
 
Betty bought a bit of butter, but the bit of butter Betty bought was bitter.
So Betty bought a better bit of butter, to make the bitter bit of butter better.

References

Tongue-twisters